FC Ararat-Armenia, is an Armenian football club based in Yerevan, founded in 2017.

History

It was founded in 2017 as FC Avan Academy by Ruben Hayrapetyan, on the basis of the young players of the Yerevan Football Academy graduates, as well as many young players from FC Pyunik.

They club's inaugural match took place in July 2017 against Erebuni SC. The friendly match ended up with a score of 3–1 in favour of Avan Academy.

At the beginning of 2018, the club was taken over by the Russian-Armenian businessman Samvel Karapetyan who renamed the football club as Ararat-Moskva, from Mount Ararat. The club was reorganized as soon as FC Ararat Moscow in Russia was denied certificate for the next season. Artak Oseyan managed the club during the 2017–18 Armenian First League season.

After being promoted to the Armenian Premier League, it was again renamed, this time to Ararat-Armenia, and will participate in the Premier League with this name.

On 2 August 2018, Vadim Skripchenko was appointed as the new head coach of Ararat-Armenia, before being sacked on 25 September 2018, and Ararat-Armenia-2 manager Artak Oseyan being appointed as caretaker manager.

On 1 October 2018, Vardan Minasyan was appointed as the new head coach of Ararat-Armenia.

On 30 May 2019, Ararat-Armenia defeated Banants 1–0 to win their first Armenian Premier League title. As a result of winning the 2018–19 Armenian Premier League, Ararat-Armenia qualified for the UEFA Champions League.

On 14 July 2020, Ararat-Armenia defended their Armenian Premier League title, securing their second league title, after defeating FC Noah 2-0. Three days later, 17 July 2020, Manager Vardan Minasyan left the club after his contract expired. On 22 July 2020, Ararat-Armenia announced David Campaña as their new manager. On 5 March 2021, David Campaña left his role as Head Coach by mutual consent, with Armen Adamyan being appointed as the Caretaker Head Coach. On 24 March 2021, Ararat-Armenia announced Anatoly Baidachny as their new Head Coach. Baidachny would leave Ararat-Armenia two and a half months later, on 8 June 2021 by mutual consent, having won just three of his twelve games in charge. On 14 June 2021, Ararat-Armenia announced that Dmitri Gunko had been appointed as the clubs new Head Coach. Following the conclusion of the 2021–22, Dmitri Gunko left his role as Head Coach after his contract was not extended. On 10 June 2022, Vardan Bichakhchyan was announced as Ararat-Armenia's new Head Coach.

League and cup

The second team of the club Ararat-Armenia-2 has been playing in the first league (2nd division) since the 2018–19 season.

European

Current squad

Out on loan

Ararat-Armenia-2

Ararat-Armenia's reserve squad play as Ararat-Armenia-2 in the Armenian First League. They currently play their home games at the Yerevan Football Academy Stadium in the Avan District of northern Yerevan.

Personnel

Owner: Samvel Karapetyan
Director General: Poghos Galstyan
Press secretary: Diana Ghazaryan
Head coach: Dmitri Gunko
Assistant coaches: Arthur Mkrtchyan, Razmik Grigoryan
Chief scout: Mher Pilosyan

Honours

Domestic
Armenian Premier League
Champions: 2018–19, 2019–20

Armenian Cup
Runners-up: 2019–20

Armenian Supercup
Winners: 2019
Runners-up: 2020

Managerial history
. Only competitive matches are counted.Player records

Armen Ambartsumyan is Ararat-Armenia's most capped player, with 129 appearances for the club, whilst Mailson Lima is the clubs leading goalscorer with 41 goal in 121 appearances across two stints.
 Players in bold signifies current Ararat-Armenia player.

Most appearances

Top goalscorers

 Clean Sheets Competitive, professional matches only, appearances including substitutes appear in brackets.''

References

External links
 Official Facebook

 
Football clubs in Armenia
Association football clubs established in 2017
Football clubs in Yerevan
2017 establishments in Armenia